Romances is a 2004 collaboration album between Faith No More vocalist Mike Patton and Norwegian singer-songwriter Kaada. The overall sound of the album was inspired by Gustav Mahler, Frédéric Chopin, Johannes Brahms and Franz Liszt with soundtrack elements. The album's track titles were taken from 18th century French songs.

Track listing

References

External links
 Official website

Kaada albums
Mike Patton albums
Ipecac Recordings albums
2004 debut albums
Collaborative albums